Starz (stylized as STARZ since 2016; pronounced "stars") is an American premium cable and satellite television network owned by Lions Gate Entertainment, and is the flagship property of parent subsidiary Starz Inc. Programming on Starz consists of theatrically released motion pictures and first-run original television series. Created in 1994 as a multiplex service of Encore (now Starz Encore), Starz operates six 24-hour, linear multiplex channels; a traditional subscription video on demand service; and a namesake over-the-top streaming platform that both acts as a TV Everywhere offering for Starz's linear television subscribers and is sold directly to streaming-only consumers.

Starz is also sold independently of traditional and over-the-top multichannel video programming distributors a la carte through Apple TV Channels and Amazon Video Channels, which feature VOD library content and live feeds of Starz's linear television services (consisting of the primary channel's East and West Coast feeds and, for Amazon Video customers, the East Coast feeds of its five multiplex channels). Starz's programming has been licensed for use by a number of channels and platforms worldwide, and the brand name is licensed by Bell Media for a companion channel of the Canadian-based company's Crave premium service.

Starz and its sister networks, Starz Encore and MoviePlex, are headquartered in Santa Monica, California, with satellite office facilities located at the Meridian International Business Center complex in Englewood, Colorado, and at a small office located on 5th Avenue in New York City. , Starz was available to approximately 28.517 million U.S. households that had a subscription to a multichannel television provider (27.675 million of which receive Starz's primary channel at minimum).

History

Launch and early history 
Starz, originally stylized as "STARZ!" with an exclamation point, was launched at 8:00 p.m. Eastern Time on February 1, 1994, primarily on cable systems operated by Tele-Communications Inc.; the first two movies aired on the network were dramas released in 1992: respectively, Scent of a Woman and The Crying Game. The network was operated as a joint venture between TCI and Liberty Media (both companies were controlled by John Malone), with TCI owning a 50.1% controlling interest in the channel.

Starz made its debut as the first phase of a seven-channel thematic multiplex that was launched by Starz (then Encore Media Group) over the course of the succeeding eight months, with the remaining six channels being launched between July and September 1994. The multiplex was intended to only include six channels, but on May 31, 1993, Encore acquired the pay cable rights to telecast recent feature films from Universal Pictures released after that year; as a result, TCI/Liberty decided to create an additional premium pay TV service to serve as a competitor to HBO and Showtime. The network carried the moniker "Encore 8" in its on-air branding as part of a numbering system that was used by Encore's multiplex channels. Early trademark filings indicated that TCI/Liberty proposed names including "Applause" and "Stars" for the service (the "s" in the latter was ultimately changed to a "z" in the final naming).

Starz focused more on recent feature films, while Starz Encore (then Encore) focused on films released between the 1960s and the 1980s, before adding recent film fare itself in July 1999. It also held the television rights to releases from Carolco Pictures, New Line Cinema (as well as its sibling labels Fine Line Features and Turner Pictures), and the Walt Disney Company–owned studios Touchstone Pictures, Hollywood Pictures and Miramax Films. Films from those studios were not carried on Starz until 1997, after Disney's output agreement with Showtime for its non-family-oriented films concluded. The network restricted the scheduling of films that contained graphic sexual or violent content to late evening and overnight time periods.

Starz's availability was mainly limited to TCI's systems at launch, debuting with a one-month free preview available to prospective subscribers; it would eventually sign its first major carriage agreement outside the TCI group, through a deal with Continental Cablevision in September 1995. Starz was available to an estimated 2.8 million pay television subscribers by 1996, only one million of whom had subscribed to a cable or satellite provider other than TCI. As a startup network, Starz endured major losses during its early years, with total deficits topping US$203 million and annual losses of US$150 million by 1997. It was predicted to lose an additional US$300 million in revenue before it was predicted to break even. In June 1997, Comcast signed an agreement to carry the network on its Pennsylvania and New Jersey systems to replace Philadelphia-based PRISM after that network shut down that October following the loss of its (and sister network SportsChannel Philadelphia's) sports programming to Comcast SportsNet Philadelphia. Partly in an effort to get the network's substantial losses off its books, TCI announced a deal on June 2, 1997, in which it transferred majority ownership of the corporate entity that operated Starz, Encore Media Group, to sister company Liberty Media; TCI retained a 20% minority ownership interest in Encore Media Group. Liberty Media assumed the former company's stake in the subsidiary in 1999, following TCI's merger with AT&T Corporation.

By May 1998, Starz maintained a subscriber base reaching 7.6 million households with a cable or satellite television subscription.

2000s onwards 

The network gained carriage deals with many other major U.S. cable and satellite providers by the early 2000s, particularly with the adoption of digital cable, allowing for providers to add channels that they (even with capacity expansions of up to 60 channels) previously had limited room to carry.

Encore Media Group was renamed the Starz Encore Media Group in 2000. As part of a corporate restructuring plan in 2003, Starz Encore Group eliminated 100 jobs in its nine regional offices, and closed four of the offices outright. On March 25, 2005, the Starz Encore Group corporate entity was renamed Starz Entertainment. A few days later, on March 28, 2005, Starz introduced a new logo, and was subsequently rebranded as "starz", in all lowercase.

On November 19, 2009, Liberty Media spun off Starz into a separate public tracking stock called Liberty Starz. On January 1, 2010, Chris Albrecht joined Starz as its president and chief executive officer, then overseeing all of the Starz entities including Starz Entertainment, Overture Films, Anchor Bay Entertainment and Film Roman. On August 8, 2012, Liberty Media announced that it would spin off the Liberty Starz subsidiary into a separate publicly traded company. The spin-off of the subsidiary was completed on January 11, 2013, with Liberty Starz changing its name to Starz as a result.

On April 5, 2016, Starz was rebranded, introducing a new logo, this time stylized as "STARZ" in all uppercase. As part of the rebranding, Starz added all the Encore channels to its moniker, therefore increasing the Starz channel lineup to 14 Starz premium channels. Its main channel was rebranded Starz Encore and carries reruns of Starz Originals in addition to films.

On June 30, 2016, Lionsgate agreed to acquire Starz Inc. for $4.4 billion in cash and stock; the acquisition was completed five months later on December 8.

In April 2019, Starz was widely criticized in the tech press and by the Electronic Frontier Foundation for sending legal demands to Twitter in order to remove links to a news article which discussed piracy but contained neither pirated content nor links to pirated content. Starz initially responded by issuing further DMCA complaints against those criticizing them, including against a tweet from the Electronic Frontier Foundation stating that "Starz should withdraw its takedown and refrain from harassing journalists". However, they subsequently apologized, clarified that the invalid DMCA claims were sent on their behalf by a third party contractor called The Social Element and promised that they are "working with our vendors to reinstate any such content that was inappropriately targeted for removal."

Channels

List of channels
Depending on the service provider, Starz provides up to twelve multiplex channels – six 24-hour multiplex channels, all of which are simulcast in both standard definition and high definition – as well as a subscription video-on-demand service (Starz On Demand). Starz broadcasts its primary and multiplex channels on Eastern and Pacific Time Zone schedules. The respective coastal feeds of each channel are usually packaged together (though most cable providers only offer the east and west coast feeds of the main Starz channel), resulting in the difference in local airtimes for a particular movie or program between two geographic locations being three hours at most.

The premium film services Encore and MoviePlex, which are also owned by Starz, Inc., operate as separate services; as such, subscribers to one of the services do not have to subscribe to any of the others. Some providers offer Encore and MoviePlex's multiplex channels on a separate digital cable tier from Starz. However, Encore and, depending on its carriage, MoviePlex are frequently sold together in a package with Starz.

Background

In 1994, Encore launched the pay television industry's first "themed" multiplex service – seven additional movie channels that each focused on a specific genre. This was intended to include only six channels, but Encore decided to launch Starz as a competitor to HBO and Showtime after it acquired the pay-TV rights to broadcast films by Universal Studios released after 1993. A numbering system was used for each service to identify itself as an Encore channel, though this system was abandoned for most of the channels in 1996, with the tagline "an encore network" (which Starz! also used, albeit sparingly) being used from then until 2002. Starz continued to heavily include the "Encore 8" moniker in its main IDs, feature presentation bumpers and select bumpers until 2002, even as it transitioned into a separate channel from Encore.

The tie to Encore branding-wise continued even as Starz was given its own slate of multiplex channels in the late 1990s. The first of these to debut was Starz! 2 in 1996, maintaining a set lineup of four different movies scheduled at the same times each day (inspired by the scheduling used by movie theaters) with the slate of films changing each Friday. This was followed in 1997 by the debut of a joint venture with BET Networks called BET Movies: Starz! 3. Two additional multiplex channels began operations in May 1999. Starz! Family carried family-oriented theatrical and home video film releases, was launched possibly in response to HBO's own family-oriented multiplex channel, HBO Family, which debuted three years earlier. The other service was Starz! Cinema, a channel featuring critically acclaimed independent films and movies outside the mainstream cinema. Starz! 2 was also renamed Starz! Theater to better reflect its format.

The first changes made following the original rollout of the multiplex occurred in 2001, with the rebranding of BET Movies: Starz! as Black Starz! after BET withdrew from the partnership during its acquisition by Viacom (which owned rival pay service Showtime at the time) in 2001. A seventh Starz multiplex channel was launched in 2004: Starz! Kids was created as a movie service featuring films aimed at children between 2 and 11 years of age, maintaining a format similar to that of Starz! Family. Unlike the other Starz multiplex channels, Starz! Kids was launched on cable systems on a case-by-case basis instead of on a broader national scale.

The entire multiplex was overhauled on March 28, 2005, as part of an extensive rebranding of the Starz and Encore services. While Encore debuted a slightly modified logo and applied the "Encore" brand to the names of its six multiplex channels, Starz underwent a more dramatic makeover, with a completely redesigned logo – which included the exclamation mark being dropped from the channel's name – and a standardized graphics package that was implemented across all of its channels (with some modifications for each channel's format). The programming formats of several channels changed entirely: Starz! Theater was relaunched as Starz Edge, a movie channel aimed primarily at men 18 to 34 years old (nicknamed "The New Generation" by the channel). Starz! Kids and Starz! Family were combined into a single channel called Starz Kids and Family, to make room for a new channel focusing on comedic feature films called Starz Comedy. Black Starz! also changed its name to Starz InBlack. The only multiplex channel (other than the primary feed) that retained its original name was Starz Cinema.

The Starz multiplex has been marketed under several names over the years including the "Starz Encore Super Pak" and the "Starz Super Pak". The multiplex now has no "official" marketed name .

On March 28, 2016, Starz introduced a new logo and tagline, "Obsessable". This coincides with a revamp of the Starz channels effective April 5 of that year. All of Encore's channels will now take on the "Starz" brand, while Encore's main channel will be rebranded "Starz Encore", which will air reruns of Starz originals in addition to films. Starz now has 14 channels in its package.

Other services

Starz HD

Starz HD is a high-definition simulcast feed of Starz that broadcasts in the 1080i resolution format. In addition to its main channel, Starz also operates high-definition simulcast feeds of its five multiplex channels. When it was launched in December 2003, the simulcast covered only the east and west coast feeds of the main Starz channel. An enhanced-definition simulcast feed and a separate HD channel called Sharper Movies HD, that would have broadcast in the 1080i format and be structured similarly to the original format of sister channel Encore's MoviePlex (in which Sharper Movies would broadcast programming from each Starz channel in daily sampler blocks), were also planned. Plans for the latter service were dropped because of a lack of interest from providers to charge a premium fee for the network. HD feeds of Starz Kids and Family, Starz Comedy and Starz Edge, followed in 2007.

The remaining Starz multiplex channels, Starz Cinema and Starz In Black, launched their HD simulcast feeds on June 23, 2010, with DirecTV becoming the first provider to offer all six channels (including both coastal feeds of the primary Starz channel) in HD. Among others, Starz HD is carried nationally by satellite providers DirecTV and Dish Network and regionally by Verizon FiOS, AT&T U-verse, Comcast Xfinity, Time Warner Cable, Cox Communications, Cablevision and Charter Communications.

Starz On Demand
Starz operates a video-on-demand (VOD) television service called Starz On Demand, which is available at no additional charge to new and existing Starz subscribers. The service was launched on September 19, 2001, debuting on Adelphia Communications' Cleveland, Ohio system. The service offers early premieres of feature films that are scheduled to premiere on Starz, up to one month prior to their pay cable debut on the primary linear channel. Starz on Demand's rotating program selection incorporates selected new titles that are added each Friday, and existing program titles held over from the previous one to two weeks. The Starz On Demand name was also used for an online broadband streaming movie service operated by Starz and RealNetworks from 2003 to 2004. In March 2011, Starz On Demand launched a third VOD service (in addition to its standard-definition and high-definition VOD services), offering movies presented in 3D to customers of Comcast and Verizon FiOS at no additional charge.

Starzplay (U.S.)

The original incarnation of Starzplay was a website and mobile app that featured original programming and feature film content from Starz available for streaming in standard or high definition. It was available to Starz subscribers of Verizon FIOS, AT&T U-verse, Cox Communications, Xfinity by Comcast and DirecTV until it was merged with Starz.com on April 5, 2016. The former incarnation of the Starzplay online service (which is structured as a TV Everywhere-style service) was launched on October 8, 2012, with the release of the iPad, iPhone and iPod Touch app until they were merged with Starz.com on April 5, 2016.

The Starzplay name was borrowed from a prior service offered in conjunction with Netflix. It was created in 2008 after the subscription streaming service struck an agreement with Starz Entertainment to allow Netflix to sub-license rights to films from distributors that maintain output deals with the linear Starz channel for online viewing – in lieu of acquiring the digital distribution rights on its own, due to the expense of acquiring newer film titles – as Netflix was considered to be merely a "content aggregator". Because Netflix chose to sub-license digital rights through Starz instead of negotiating with the studios, Walt Disney Studios Motion Pictures threatened not to renew its output deal with Starz unless it either discontinued its deal with Netflix or paid Disney a licensing fee for digital streaming rights to its films (Netflix ended up assuming rights to most film releases by Walt Disney Studios from Starz in 2016).

Starzplay (as a Netflix service) was first made available to Starz subscribers of the Verizon FiOS television service. Starz content (including most of its original programming and series content that the channel acquired through domestic and international distributors) was made available on Netflix's "Watch Instantly" platform. It was the third subscription video-on-demand online streaming service operated by Starz: Starz Ticket operated from 2004 to 2006, under a joint venture between Starz Entertainment and RealNetworks. Starz offered its own separate online movie service, Vongo, to its subscribers from 2006 until it discontinued the service on September 30, 2008.

On September 1, 2011, Starz announced that it would not renew its streaming agreement with Netflix, which ended on February 28, 2012; movie titles that are available on DVD from Sony Pictures, Disney and other studios that maintain pay television distribution deals with Starz were not affected and can be acquired from Netflix by this method. With the expiration of the Netflix deal, film content from studios with which Starz maintains broadcast rights were no longer available for online streaming, particularly as Netflix and certain similar services such as Vudu did not have separate streaming rights to films from these individual studios. Prior to the beta launch of its Starz Online service (which became Starzplay upon its official launch), Starz announced on November 18, 2011 that it was developing a streaming application for mobile devices, allowing the network's subscribers – and in early reports, speculation that possibly non-subscription television subscribers would be allowed as well – to view Starz's series and film content. The app was released on October 9, 2012 for the iPad, iPhone and iPod Touch, and on May 7, 2013 for Android devices. An app for authenticated subscribers for the Xbox 360 was released on December 3, 2013, followed by a similar app for the Xbox One on August 5, 2014.

Lionsgate+ 

Lionsgate+ (previously Starzplay), Starzplay Arabia, and Lionsgate Play (in the south and Southeast Asia region) are Starz' international streaming services for viewers outside North America.

Starzplay Arabia was the first Starz-branded service to be localized outside the United States, launching on April 2, 2015 in 17 countries in the Middle East and North Africa region, breaching those territories before its biggest competitor in media streaming being Netflix. Starzplay Arabia remains available even as the U.S. version of the service has been discontinued. In 2018, the service became available in Pakistan, the first country outside the MENA region where Starzplay was available. In 2019, Starzplay was launched in Brazil, France, Germany, Ireland, Spain and the United Kingdom. In 2020, it became available in Argentina, Chile,  and Italy. In March 2022, a 57% majority stake in Starzplay Arabia was acquired by a consortium, led by e& (formerly known as Etisalat) and the Abu Dhabi-based investment group ADQ. The deal was valued at $420m. In January 2021, Starzplay Arabia signed a deal with Abu Dhabi Media, which allows subscribers to watch UFC fights and events live.

In several countries, Lionsgate+ is provided through partnerships with cable services, such as Vodafone in Spain, Movistar TV in Argentina, IndiHome in Indonesia and PLDT Home in the Philippines or within Apple TV as well.

On September 28, 2022, Lionsgate announced the international Starzplay service would be rebranded as Lionsgate+ the following day in most countries, eliminating much of the conflict between Lionsgate and Disney's Star brand. The Starzplay Arabia and Lionsgate Play services will not be affected at this time, while Starz in the U.S. and Canada merely rebranded with a new version of the "STARZ" logo.

In November 2022, it was announced that Lionsgate+ was ending operations in the markets of France, Germany, Italy, Spain, Benelux, the Nordics, and Japan before the end of the company's fiscal year.

Starz app and subscription service
On April 5, 2016, Starz launched a new app and over-the-top subscription service to compete with HBO Now and Showtime's OTT subscription service. The new app, which replaced the StarzPlay service, allowed users to access Starz programming regardless of whether they had a TV package or not. The Starz app also includes offline playback functionality, allowing users to download and watch content without an internet connection.

In response to the discontinuation of StarzPlay, Comcast has blocked access to the new Starz app for Comcast Xfinity customers, forcing them to instead access the network's authenticated content through the Xfinity app and website and older StarzPlay apps on platforms such as Roku. Currently, Comcast is the only major distributor to do this.

Starz on Amazon Video
In the winter of 2015, Amazon Video began offering Starz and rival premium network Showtime as add-on subscriptions for their customers; the cost is $8.99 per month, after a seven-day free trial.  The content deal between Amazon and Starz not only offers the channel's current and back catalog of programming, but also movies and classic TV series currently airing on Encore and its branded networks, as well as live East Coast feeds of the Starz-branded networks and Encore.

Programming

Film library
, Starz and sister networks Starz Encore and MoviePlex maintain exclusive first-run film licensing agreements with Sony Pictures Entertainment (since January 2005; including content from subsidiaries Columbia Pictures, Sony Pictures Classics, Screen Gems, Destination Films, Triumph Films, and TriStar Pictures, but not Sony Pictures Animation  because they have a separate deal with Netflix), Anchor Bay Entertainment, EuropaCorp and Warren Miller Films (since 1997).

The first-run film output agreement with Sony was renewed for nine years on February 11, 2013; the Warren Miller output deal was renewed for ten years on October 19, 2009. On April 8, 2021, Sony announced that they would not be renewing the agreement with Starz in favor of a new first-run agreement with Netflix. On July 15, 2021, Starz reached a licensing deal with Universal Pictures for first-run movies 18 months after they stream on Peacock and Prime Video respectively.

Starz also shows sub-runs (runs of films that have recently received broadcast or syndicated television airings) of theatrical films from Walt Disney Studios Motion Pictures (including subsidiaries Walt Disney Pictures, Touchstone Pictures, Marvel Studios, Lucasfilm, 20th Century Studios, and Hollywood Pictures - all for films released before 2016), Warner Bros. Entertainment (including content from subsidiaries New Line Cinema, Turner Entertainment – both for films released prior to 2005 – and Castle Rock Entertainment), Universal Pictures (including content from subsidiaries Universal Animation Studios, Focus Features, and DreamWorks Animation all for films released prior to 2003), Metro-Goldwyn-Mayer (including content from subsidiaries United Artists, Orion Pictures, and The Samuel Goldwyn Company), Paramount Pictures (including content from DreamWorks Pictures (pre-2011), Republic Pictures, Nickelodeon Movies, Miramax, Paramount Vantage and television rights to the Cannon Films and Carolco Pictures libraries), Revolution Studios, Overture Films, Yari Film Group, and the network's sister company Lions Gate Entertainment (since 2012).

Films for which Starz has pay-cable rights usually also run on Encore and MoviePlex during the duration of its term of licensing. From 1995 to 2002, Starz had broadcast occasional original made-for-pay cable movies produced by the in-house company Starz! Pictures.

In January 1997, Starz secured a licensing agreement with Paramount Pictures, broadcasting over 300 titles. Paramount's first contract with Starz expired in January 2006. In April 2013, Starz reassumed sub-run rights to Paramount Pictures' feature film releases. Films that were initially broadcast through this deal included Dear God, All I Want for Christmas and Boomerang.

Former first-run contracts
At the time of its launch, Starz had secured exclusive first-run film rights with Universal Pictures, Touchstone Pictures, Hollywood Pictures, Miramax, New Line Cinema, Walt Disney Pictures, and Carolco Pictures. Between 1995 and 2005, Starz had also broadcast films from Turner Pictures and New Line Cinema. Starz's contract with Universal expired in late 2002, with HBO and Starz sharing half of Universal's films during the 2003 calendar year before HBO assumed pay television rights in 2004.

The first-run film output agreement with Walt Disney Studios Motion Pictures expired after December 2015, with Netflix assuming pay television rights in January 2016 (excluding films released by Touchstone Pictures, which were retained by Starz through a separate contract). Through at least the first half of 2016, Starz provided Disney films that were released before the expiration, such as Inside Out and The Good Dinosaur, but none released after, such as Zootopia.

Television series

Original programming
Starz expanded its program offerings to include some original television series by the late 1990s with five entertainment news programs and shows that focused on the making of upcoming or current feature films (such as Starz Movie News and Hollywood One on One); some of these programs were also aired on Encore. In 2005, Starz began expanding its original programming slate in order to compete with rivals Showtime and HBO, with the inclusion of scripted series. Some of the initial series (such as Kung Faux, The Bronx Bunny Show and Head Case) maintained running times considered unconventional for a live-action series, usually running under 15 minutes in length; half-hour and hour-long series were eventually incorporated on the schedule by 2010 (including shows such as Spartacus, Torchwood: Miracle Day in 2011, Boss and Da Vinci's Demons).

The number of original series that debuted each year on Starz has varied, reaching a high of four series during the 2011 calendar year. In 2013, Starz gave a series order to Outlander, a drama based on the Outlander book series by Diana Gabaldon. The project, from Battlestar Galactica developer Ronald D. Moore and Sony Pictures Television, received a 16-episode order, with production beginning in Scotland (where the books are set) in October 2013. Outlander has received five nominations for the 2015 Women's Image Network Awards, including a nomination in the Drama Series category. Caitriona Balfe, who plays the leading character in the show, also received a nomination in the Actress Drama Series category.

After Starz's 2016 acquisition by Lionsgate, the network has moved to produce more original content, with president of programming Carmi Zlotnik calling Starz a "content pump" for Lionsgate.

Acquired programming
Multiplex channel Starz Kids & Family also features some series programming, which are aimed at young children and preteens. That channel runs two program blocks: "Building Blocks", a block airing on Monday through Saturday mornings that features animated series (such as Dragon Hunters, Gawayn, Zombie Hotel, Savage Family Wild and Matt's Monsters) and the "Six Block" (originally titled "Camp Block" from its launch in March 2011 until the two-hour block was moved from mid-afternoon slots varying on the film schedule to a set timeslot of 6:00 pm Eastern Time in January 2012), a teenage-focused block airing weekday afternoons that features mainly imported series from English-speaking countries outside of America like Canada, Australia and the United Kingdom (such as Wingin' It, 
Genie in the House, Majority Rules and Sadie J). The two blocks are similar to those seen on sister channel Encore's multiplex channel Encore Wam between 1994 and 2009.

Other ventures
Starz Entertainment has expanded considerably with the presence of its Starz and Encore family of multiplex networks, as well as ventures into television and film production, and home video distribution.

 In 1999, Starz launched the in-house company Starz Pictures, a production company that produced made-for-cable films for the television channel; Starz Pictures' only major film project was the 2002 telefilm Joe and Max. Starz Pictures shut down that same year.

 In November 2006, Chris McGurk and Danny Rosett launched Overture Films, an independent movie studio that Liberty Media operated out of its Starz Entertainment division. After a proposed sale of the company failed to materialize through the absence of willing buyers, the studio was shut down in October 2010, with its marketing and distribution operations handed over to Relativity Media; Overture's small library of less than 20 films will continue to be distributed by Anchor Bay Entertainment for DVD release and by Starz for television broadcast.

 In 2007, Starz Entertainment purchased IDT Entertainment, which was renamed Starz Media. As a result of the purchase, Starz acquired IDT subsidiaries Anchor Bay Entertainment, Digital Production Solutions (DPS), and New Arc Entertainment. The Weinstein Company, a film studio run by former Miramax heads Bob and Harvey Weinstein, purchased a 25% stake in Starz Media (but not the Starz parent company) on January 4, 2011, with Anchor Bay entering into a multi-year domestic distribution agreement of theatrical feature films released by The Weinstein Company and its Dimension Films subsidiary.

 As part of IDT Corporation's purchase by Starz, Starz Entertainment also acquired two animation studios: Toronto-based IDT animation studio (formerly DKP Studios), which was renamed Starz Animation, and Manga Entertainment, an international distributor of Japanese animation. A third animation studio that was also acquired due to the IDT purchase, Film Roman, was sold in October 2010 to a production company owned by a group of investors led by former Film Roman studio president Scott Greenberg called Bento Box Entertainment.

Branding
Starz's logo has incorporated a star in some form since its launch. In the original logo that was used from its launch in February 1994 until March 27, 2005, the star was composed of a two silhouettes (one star being embedded within a larger one), and a "STARZ!" logotype styled after 1930s-era movie poster typography. The original accompanying graphics were set around a CGI movie theater, with the main network ID featuring seats that opened by themselves, various theater imagery and even images resembling the Caduceus, while feature presentation bumpers also heavily used the movie theater themes (using spotlights and film canisters) and the "Encore 8" branding. The "theater" look that had been used since the network's launch was ultimately abandoned in May 2002, when it switched to a package based around natural themes (particularly water); a seven-note fanfare was also introduced as a musical motif; the new look did not carry over to the multiplex channels. Starz! also introduced the "InfoBar", a lower-third banner graphic that appears on-screen during promotional breaks and during the end credits of films seen on the channel, originally purposed to promote upcoming programs.

This logo was abandoned for an abstract star shooting upwards and a Helvetica Neue wordmark in March 2005 as part of a major rebrand of the network that included a blue colored gel standardized graphics package with modifications (different colors such as grey, red, green, purple, and orange) for each multiplex channel; the fanfare from the previous graphics package was also reorchestrated by Mixology Post. The "InfoBar" also began to be used to promote events on the other Starz networks and to provide entertainment news headlines supplied by Variety (a similar version was adopted for use by the Encore networks). That year, Starz began branding its feature film content with an opaque logo bug appearing on the lower-right corner of the screen for two minutes each half-hour, though the 2005 logo bug for Starz channels appears for the rest of the movie's run in Summer 2007, along with Encore and Movieplex channels until Starz reverted them back to 2 minutes for their logo bug during the April 2008 rebrand, except for Encore, Movieplex, and Starz Cinema; the addition of the on-screen logos was cited by former Starz president Tom Southwick due to a large number of subscribers not knowing which of the channels they were watching when they tuned in, particularly if started viewing one of the channels after the start of a film.

A new logo was introduced in April 2008, with lowercase "starz" typing featuring an asteroid-shaped star inserted between the "a" and "r"; the coloring of the logo was modified to an orange/gold rendering in April 2011. The channel replaced the opaque on-screen logos with a bright white logo bug on all channels and a bright orange bug for Starz HD as of April 7, 2008 and Starz Kids & Family's HD simulcast feed in July 2011. After the 2011 logo rebrand, the bright white version of the 2008 logo for Starz channels stayed on screen for the second time until mid-2013 that it will reverted to two-minute version, along with Encore channels. After the current logo's introduction, the "InfoBar" began to once again serve only to promote programming on the main Starz channel, while it serves mainly as a network ID on some of its multiplex channels.

In 2016, Starz redesigned its logo again; the current logo is the word "STARZ" in bold white capital letters against a black background.

In 2022, following the rebrand of Lionsgate+, Starz got a new brand and is colored in blue (yellow for gradient), akin to Lionsgate's main color.

Network slogans

 Starz More of What You Want for Less (1994–???)
 Only on Starz and No Other Movie Channel (Early February 1994–August 1995)
 Starz! – Big Movies and More (September 1, 1995–late October 1998)
 100% Movies (November 1, 1998–Late August 1999)
 Movies, Movies, New Hit Movies (September 1, 1999–early September 2000)
 #1 in New Hit Movies (September 18, 2000–late December 2004)
 An Influx of Movies – Only on Starz (Early January 2005–late March 2008)
 Are You Ready? (April 2008–late August 2012)
 Taking You Places (September 2012–March 2016)
 Obsessable (April 2016–September 2022)
 Just You Watch (September 2022–present)

See also
 PRISM (TV channel)

References

External links

 
 Starz Media corporate website

Starz Entertainment Group
Companies based in Meridian, Colorado
Television channels and stations established in 1994
Television networks in the United States
Commercial-free television networks
Movie channels
Lionsgate subsidiaries
2016 mergers and acquisitions
Former Liberty Media subsidiaries